Know The Score was an Irish sports quiz show produced by RTÉ which started airing on 6 November 2016 on RTÉ One.
The show was presented by Jacqui Hurley with team captains Ruby Walsh and Shane Byrne.

References

2016 Irish television series debuts
Irish quiz shows
Irish sports television series
RTÉ original programming